Gavião is a Portuguese municipality in the District of Portalegre, in the historical region of Alentejo. The population in 2011 was 4,132, in an area of 294.59 km2.

The municipality is bounded by Mação to the West and North, Nisa to the East, Crato to the Southeast, Ponte de Sor to the Southwest and Abrantes to the West.

Gavião received a foral from King D. Manuel I of Portugal on November the 23rd of 1519, nowadays, that day is celebrated as municipal holiday.

Parishes
The municipality is composed of 4 parishes:

 Belver
 Comenda
 Gavião e Atalaia
 Margem

Notable people 
 Eusébio Leão (1864–1926) a Portuguese physician and republican politician.
 José Adriano Pequito Rebelo (1892–1983) a writer, politician and aviator.
 Francisco Rolão Preto (1893–1977) a Portuguese politician, journalist and fascist leader

References

External links
 Photos from Gavião

Populated places in Portalegre District
Municipalities of Portalegre District
People from Gavião, Portugal